Argentines have won five Nobel Prizes since 1905. The following is a complete list of Nobel laureates from Argentina:

Laureates

Nominees

References

 
Argentine
Lists of Argentine people